Saymon Ahmed (born 1 September 1990) is a Bangladeshi cricketer. He made his first-class debut for Rajshahi Division in the 2009–10 National Cricket League on 26 January 2010. He made his List A debut for Agrani Bank Cricket Club in the 2017–18 Dhaka Premier Division Cricket League on 15 February 2018.

References

External links
 

1990 births
Living people
Bangladeshi cricketers
Rajshahi Division cricketers
Rangpur Division cricketers
Agrani Bank Cricket Club cricketers
People from Lalmonirhat District